Skeeterville is an unincorporated community in San Saba County, in the U.S. state of Texas. According to the Handbook of Texas, the community had a population of 10 in 2000.

History
The Nowlin Family donated land for a Church of Christ to be built on, and in 1915, erected a brush arbor. Roy “Dogie” Wilson named the community Skeeterville in 1920 because his horse was attacked by mosquitos whenever they would cross the marshy ground. He established a store and gas station in 1927. R.C. Phillips moved his store here from Holt in 1922. A church was built shortly after World War II. A church and a business were located in Skeeterville in 1984 and had 10 residents in 2000.

Geography

Education
Skeeterville did not have a school, so children went to school in either Richland Springs or Locker. Today, the community is served by the Richland Springs Independent School District.

References

Unincorporated communities in San Saba County, Texas
Unincorporated communities in Texas